Glen Joe Walker (born January 16, 1952) is a former American football punter who played two seasons with the Los Angeles Rams of the National Football League. He played college football at the University of Southern California and attended Gardena High School in Harbor Gateway, Los Angeles. He was also a member of the Los Angeles Express of the United States Football League.

References

External links
Just Sports Stats

Living people
1952 births
Players of American football from Los Angeles
American football punters
USC Trojans football players
Los Angeles Rams players
Los Angeles Express players
People from Torrance, California
Gardena High School alumni